John Belling (7 October 1866–28 February 1933) was a cytogeneticist who developed the iron-acetocarmine staining technique which is used in the study of chromosomes.

Born in Aldershot in England in 1866, the son of John Belling (1827–1884) and Lydia Ann née Tart (1842–1915), he studied at Stonehouse Grammar School, King's College London and University College London, and then entered Mason College (which later became the University of Birmingham) where he received his BSc in 1894. He married Hannah Sewall in June 1919 in Forest Glen, Maryland, USA and received an honorary DSc in 1922 from the University of Maine in recognition of his work.

In his work with Albert F. Blakeslee at Cold Spring Harbor on Datura (1920–1927) and at the University of California, Berkeley (1928–1933) Belling used plants such as lilies and hyacinths to demonstrate that segments between non-homogeneous chromosomes can interchange. He was able to make accurate estimates of chromosome numbers and proposed that chromomeres, the small condensations along the chromosome, were individual genes.

Throughout his career Belling had many mental health problems that required frequent hospitalisation. He died suddenly on 28 February 1933 in Alameda in California, USA.

References

John Belling Collection

1866 births
1933 deaths
Scientists from Aldershot
Alumni of the University of Birmingham
English geneticists